#MosqueMeToo is predominantly a Muslim women's movement where female pilgrims speak up about sexual abuse experienced on the Hajj, the Islamic pilgrimage to one of Islam's holiest places, Mecca, Saudi Arabia. The movement spread to Muslim women sharing sexual abuse experiences at other Muslim religious centers and holy places across the world such as at Jama Masjid, New Delhi, India. The usage of the 'Me Too' in the movement stems from the Me Too movement, which gained worldwide prominence in October 2017.

Background 
In February 2018, a Pakistani Muslim woman shared her experiences on Facebook of sexual abuse at the Hajj. The post was subsequently deleted, but not before it had been seen by enough people to inspire more women to share their experiences.

Mona Eltahawy, an Egyptian American journalist, shared her experiences of sexual abuse on Hajj in a book in 1982, which were retweeted in February using the hashtag #MosqueMeToo. At the time of the event she remembered thinking, "Who wants to talk about sexual assault at a holy place? No one would believe it." Many other women came to the social media using the hashtag #MosqueMeToo to also share their experiences of sexual abuse on this religious pilgrimage.

Critiques
On social media some people reacted to this movement critically, by saying that it is a tool of Islamophobia or Western propaganda.

See also 
 MeToo movement
 Incidents during the Hajj

References 

Internet-based activism
Feminism in the Middle East
Hashtags
Sexual harassment
Women's rights in the Middle East
Sexual misconduct allegations
Violence against women in Asia
Hajj accounts
History of women in Saudi Arabia